A list of British films released in 1998.

1998

See also
 1998 in film
 1998 in British music
 1998 in British radio
 1998 in British television
 1998 in the United Kingdom
 List of 1998 box office number-one films in the United Kingdom

References

External links

1998
Films
Lists of 1998 films by country or language